Maîtres de l'Affiche (Masters of the Poster) refers to 256 color lithographic plates used to create an art publication during the Belle Époque in Paris, France. The collection, reproduced from the original works of ninety-seven artists in a smaller 11 x 15 inch format, was put together by Jules Chéret, the father of poster art.

Publishing history
The varied selection of prints were sold in packages of four and delivered monthly to subscribers. On sixteen occasions during the selling period between December 1895 through November 1900, the monthly package included a bonus of a specially created lithograph.

A complete set, in five volumes, was sold in 2014 for US$43,450.

Selected posters
All the poster, in alphabetical order, can be seen on the Commons page: Les Maîtres de l'Affiche.

The artists 
Indexes of posters in the collection are given after names of their authors.

References

External links

Lithographs
1890s works
French art publications
Advertisements
Belle Époque